This Is My Affair is a 1937 American crime film directed by William A. Seiter and starring Robert Taylor, Barbara Stanwyck, Victor McLaglen and Brian Donlevy. It was released by 20th Century Fox.

Plot
In 1901, US President William McKinley is put under great pressure by everyone, even US Bank Examiner Henry Maxwell, to do something about a gang of bank robbers nobody has been able to bring to justice. He sends U.S. Navy Lieutenant Richard L. Perry undercover without notifying anyone, not even the Secret Service.

Richard, using the alias Joe Patrick, makes a pass at singer Lil Duryea. Her stepbrother, Batiste, not only owns the casino in Saint Paul, Minnesota where she performs, but is also one of the ringleaders of the gang. Lil takes a liking to Joe, but since Batiste's hulking right-hand man, Jock Ramsay,   considers her his girl, she tries to brush Joe off. Joe is undeterred and soon persuades her to go out with him whenever Batiste and Jock leave town on one of their robberies.

When Batiste learns that Lil loves Joe and is convinced that he is a bank robber himself, Batiste invites Joe to join the gang. Later, though, Lil tries to talk Joe into running away with her. He agrees, even writing a letter of resignation addressed to McKinley, but changes his mind. He has yet to learn the identity of the mastermind behind the whole thing. As a result, however, Lil breaks up with him.

Joe notifies the President about the next robbery, hoping that when they are caught, he can find out the boss's name. Batiste is killed and Jock wounded when they put up a fight.

In prison, Joe works on Jock, finally getting him to reveal that the Bank Examiner is the mastermind. However, McKinley is shot before getting Joe's letter. Nobody believes Joe's story, and both he and Jock are sentenced to death.

When Lil visits him, he confesses everything and begs her to go to see Admiral George Dewey. Embittered that he lied to her and got her stepbrother killed, Lil refuses, but as the executions near, she rushes to George. Together, they go to see the new President, Theodore Roosevelt. He does not believe her until an official finally remembers McKinley instructing him to read a secret paper in the event of a letter being received with a certain symbol on it and him being unavailable. Convinced, Roosevelt telephones just after Jock's execution and before Joe's. Afterward, Joe and Lil are reunited.

Cast
 Robert Taylor as Lt. Richard L. Perry
 Barbara Stanwyck as Lil Duryea
 Victor McLaglen as Jock Ramsay
 Brian Donlevy as Batiste Duryea
 John Carradine as Ed
 Douglas Fowley as Alec
 Alan Dinehart as Doc Keller
 Sig Ruman as Gus 
 Robert McWade as Admiral Dewey 
 Sidney Blackmer as President Theodore Roosevelt
 Frank Conroy as President William McKinley
 Marjorie Weaver as Miss Blackburn
 J.C. Nugent as Ernie
 Willard Robertson as George Andrews
 Paul Hurst as Bowler
 Douglas Wood as Henry Maxwell
 John Hamilton as Warden 
 Joseph Crehan as Priest 
 Lon Chaney, Jr. as Federal Agent (uncredited)
 Edward Peil Sr. as Secretary Hayes (uncredited)

Reception
Writing for Night and Day in 1937, Graham Greene gave the film a good review, asserting that it was "the best American melodrama of the year". Although Greene notes the unrealistic aspects of the plot, he praises the "cunning direction" and expresses enjoyment of the tension-imbuing "sense of doom" present in many scenes. Greene also praised the acting of both Taylor and McLaglen.

References

External links
 
 
 
 

1937 films
Cultural depictions of William McKinley
American romantic drama films
American black-and-white films
Films directed by William A. Seiter
Films set in 1901
Films set in Minnesota
Films with screenplays by Lamar Trotti
1937 romantic drama films
20th Century Fox films
1937 crime drama films
American crime drama films
Films scored by Arthur Lange
Films with screenplays by Kubec Glasmon
1930s American films